Rudolfplatz is an interchange station and hub on the Cologne Stadtbahn lines 1, 7, 12 and 15 in the Cologne district of Innenstadt. The station is located at Rudolfplatz, a major junction between the Cologne Ring and Aachener Straße.  It opened in 1987 and is divided into an overground part for lines 1 and 7 and an underground part for lines 12 and 15.

Notable places nearby 
 Hahnentor
 Hohenzollernring entertainment district
 Millowitsch-Theater, Aachener Straße

See also 
 List of Cologne KVB stations

References

External links 
 
 station info page 
 station layout diagram 

Cologne KVB stations
Innenstadt, Cologne
Railway stations in Germany opened in 1987
1987 establishments in West Germany
Cologne-Bonn Stadtbahn stations